Edna Fault is a 584-foot (178m) strike-slip fault in Edna Valley, California, known for its abrupt right angle shape when viewed from the north or south. Its cliff face faces east.

Geology 
Edna Fault is part of the San Luis (Mount Buchon) range in San Luis Obispo County, California. It contains both Miocene and Pliocene strata against a Franciscan basement and forms the northern border of the Pismo syncline. According to trenching and bedrock mapping studies, the fault was inactive during the late Quaternary period.

Wildlife 
Known flora and fauna of Edna Fault includes red-tailed hawk, ground squirrels, bobcats, and coast live oaks, among others.

Land use 
Though many local residents have expressed interest in hiking or climbing the fault, the property is under private ownership and such activities are uncommon.

A single road owned by PG&E leads up behind the fault nearly to the edge.

References 

Strike-slip faults
Geographic areas of seismological interest
Seismic faults of California